Octopus mimus (Gould octopus) is commonly found between northern Peru and northern Chile. The species is relatively large with a round sacciform mantle without fins. The tentacles are moderately large, approximately 4 times longer than the mantle. The 3rd tentacle on the right holds the short, thin copulatory organ in males. The color ranges, with individuals commonly speckled a mix of gray, yellow, black, green.  It is primarily benthic, living in rocky substrates and kelp forests until depths of 200  m. The species is dicecious, breeding throughout the year with one or two peaks depending on the latitude. After mating the female cares for the eggs letting her body deteriorate until death. This animal grows up to 115 cm in length and 3.7 kg in females and 107 cm in length and 4.4 kg in males. Juveniles can double in size every 30 to 60 days. The Gould octopus is an opportunistic predator feeding primarily on crustaceans, mollusks, fish, and echinoderms. This species is commonly fished in Peru and Chile.

References

Octopodidae
Cephalopods described in 1852
Invertebrates of Peru
Molluscs of Chile

Méndez-Abarca F. & R. Pepe-Victoriano (2020) Invertebrados marinos del norte de Chile: guía para la identificación y mantención en cautiverio. Vol. ll. Fundación Reino Animal & ONG por la conservación de la vida salvaje. Arica, Chile. 1-85 pp.